Bear Creek is a tributary of the Sammamish River in King County, Washington, United States.

The Marymoor Prehistoric Indian Site in Redmond shows human occupation in the vicinity of the creek with artifacts on its banks dating to 4,000 BCE.

References

Redmond, Washington
Rivers of King County, Washington